Hatherley and Reddings Cricket Club Ground is a cricket ground in Cheltenham, Gloucestershire.  The first recorded match held on the ground came in 1986 when Hatherley and Reddings Cricket Club played the Netherlands.  The ground later held a single List A match when the Gloucestershire Cricket Board played the Yorkshire Cricket Board in the 1999 NatWest Trophy, with the Yorkshire Cricket Board winning by 7 runs.

Hatherley and Reddings Cricket Club still use the ground to this day.

References

External links
Hatherley and Reddings Cricket Club Ground at ESPNcricinfo
Hatherley and Reddings Cricket Club Ground at CricketArchive

Cricket grounds in Gloucestershire
Sports venues in Cheltenham
Sports venues completed in 1986